Erik Sabel (born October 14, 1974) is a former Major League Baseball pitcher who played for three seasons. He played for the Arizona Diamondbacks in 1999 and 2001 and the Detroit Tigers in 2002.

Following his playing career, Sabel has been pitching coach for the minor league Yakima Bears (2005–2007), South Bend Silver Hawks (2008–2009), and Visalia Rawhide (2010). In 2011, he became baseball coach for Mountain View High School in Tucson, Arizona.

References

External links

1974 births
Living people
Arizona Diamondbacks players
Detroit Tigers players
Baseball players from Indiana
Major League Baseball pitchers
Lethbridge Black Diamonds players
High Desert Mavericks players
Tennessee Tech Golden Eagles baseball players
Tulsa Drillers players
Tucson Sidewinders players
El Paso Diablos players
Toledo Mud Hens players